Walter D. Corrigan Sr. was a politician in Wisconsin.

Biography
Corrigan was born Walter Dickson Corrigan on December 28, 1875 in Almond, Wisconsin. He would attend Iowa State University, where he was a member of the baseball and football teams, and Drake University Law School.

Corrigan married twice. First, to Jessie Anna Donaldson, who died in 1925. Second, to Libby Miller, who died in 1976. He had six children. Corrigan died on November 25, 1951 in Mequon, Wisconsin.

Political career
Corrigan was District Attorney of Waushara County, Wisconsin from 1899 to 1901 and Assistant Attorney General of Wisconsin from 1903 to 1905 as a Republican. In 1934 and 1940, Corrigan was a candidate for the United States House of Representatives from Wisconsin's 6th congressional district as a member of the Wisconsin Progressive Party. He lost to incumbent Michael Reilly in 1934 and to incumbent Frank Bateman Keefe in 1940. Additionally, he was an unsuccessful candidate for the Wisconsin Supreme Court.

Electoral history

| colspan="6" style="text-align:center;background-color: #e9e9e9;"| General Election, April 1916

References

People from Portage County, Wisconsin
People from Waushara County, Wisconsin
Wisconsin Republicans
Wisconsin Progressives (1924)
20th-century American politicians
Wisconsin lawyers
Iowa State Cyclones baseball players
Iowa State Cyclones football players
Baseball players from Wisconsin
Players of American football from Wisconsin
1875 births
1951 deaths
Drake University Law School alumni